The Battle of Varna took place on 10 November 1444 near Varna in eastern Bulgaria. The Ottoman army under Sultan Murad II (who did not actually rule the sultanate at the time) defeated the Crusaders commanded by King Władysław III of Poland and Hungary, John Hunyadi (acting as commander of the combined Christian forces) and Mircea II of Wallachia. It was the final battle of the unsuccessful Crusade of Varna.

Background
The Hungarian Kingdom fell into crisis after the death of King Sigismund in 1437. His son-in-law and successor, King Albert, ruled for only two years and died in 1439, leaving his widow Elizabeth with an unborn child, Ladislaus the Posthumous. The Hungarian noblemen then called the young King Władysław III of Poland to the throne of Hungary, expecting his aid in defense against the Ottomans. After his Hungarian coronation, he never went back to his homeland again, assuming rule of the Hungarian Kingdom next to the influential nobleman John Hunyadi.

After failed expeditions in 1440–1442 against Belgrade and Transylvania, and the defeats of the "long campaign" of Hunyadi in 1442–1443, the Ottoman sultan Murad II signed a ten-year truce with Hungary. After he had made peace with the Karaman Emirate in Anatolia in August 1444, he resigned the throne to his twelve-year-old son Mehmed II.

Anticipating an Ottoman invasion encouraged by the young and inexperienced new Ottoman sultan, Hungary co-operated with Venice and Pope Eugene IV to organize a new crusader army led by Hunyadi and Władysław III. On receipt of this news, Mehmed II understood that he was too young and inexperienced to successfully fight the coalition. He recalled Murad II to the throne to lead the army into battle, but Murad II refused. Angry at his father, who had long since retired to a contemplative life in southwestern Anatolia, Mehmed II wrote, "If you are the Sultan, come and lead your armies. If I am the Sultan I hereby order you to come and lead my armies." It was only after receiving this letter that Murad II agreed to lead the Ottoman army.

Preparations
The mixed Papal army was composed mainly of Hungarian, Polish, Bohemian (whose combined armies numbered 16,000) and Wallachian (4,000) forces, with smaller detachments of papal troops, Teutonic Knights, Czechs, Bosnians, Croats, Bulgarians, Lithuanians, and Ruthenians. Troops from Croatia and Bosnia were led by Croatian nobleman Franko Talovac.

Papal, Venetian and Burgundian ships under Alvise Loredan had blockaded the Dardanelles as the Hungarian army was to advance on Varna, while a second flotilla comprising six ships (two Burgundian, two Ragusan and two Byzantine) blockaded the Bosphorus. Both failed, and the main Ottoman force from Asia, including the sultan, crossed the Bosphorus on 18 October 1444. The Hungarian advance was rapid, Ottoman fortresses were bypassed, while local Bulgarians from Vidin, Oryahovo, and Nicopolis joined the army (Fruzhin, son of Ivan Shishman, also participated in the campaign with his own guard). On October 10 near Nicopolis, some 7,000 Wallachian cavalrymen under Mircea II, one of Vlad Dracul's sons, also joined.

Armenian refugees in the Kingdom of Hungary also took part in the wars of their new country against the Ottomans as early as the battle of Varna in 1444, when some Armenians were seen amongst the Christian forces.

Deployment

Late on November 9, a large Ottoman army of around 60,000 men approached Varna from the west. At a supreme military council called by Hunyadi during the night, the papal legate, cardinal Julian Cesarini, insisted on a quick withdrawal. However, the Christians were caught between the Black Sea, Lake Varna, the steep wooded slopes of the Franga Plateau (356 m high), and the enemy. Cesarini then proposed a defense using the Wagenburg of the Hussites until the arrival of the Christian fleet. The Hungarian magnates and the Croatian and Czech commanders backed him, but the young (20-year-old) Władysław and Hunyadi rejected the defensive tactics. Hunyadi declared: "To escape is impossible, to surrender is unthinkable. Let us fight with bravery and honor our arms." Władysław accepted this position and gave him the command. Andreas del Palatio states that Hunyadi commanded the "Wallachian army" indicating a large Romanian component in Hunyadi's personal army.

In the morning of November 10, Hunyadi deployed the army of some 20,000 crusaders as an arc between Lake Varna and the Franga plateau; the line was about 3.5 km long. Two banners with a total of 3,500 men from the king's Polish and Hungarian bodyguards, Hungarian royal mercenaries, and banners of Hungarian nobles held the center. The Wallachian cavalry was left in reserve behind the center.

The right flank that lined up the hill towards the village of Kamenar numbered 6,500 men in 5 banners. Dalmatian John de Dominis, Bishop of Varadin with his personal banner led the force; Cesarini commanded a banner of German mercenaries and a Bosnian one. The Bishop of Eger  Simon Rozgonyi led his own banner, and the military governor of Slavonia, ban Franko Talovac, commanded one Croatian banner.

The left flank, a total of 5,000 men in 5 banners, was led by Michael Szilágyi, Hunyadi's brother in law, and was made up of Hunyadi's Transylvanians, Bulgarians, German mercenaries and banners of Hungarian magnates. Behind the Hungarians, closer to the Black Sea and the lake, was the Wagenburg, defended by 300 or 600 Czech and Ruthenian mercenaries under hetman Ceyka, along with Poles, Lithuanians and Wallachians. Every wagon was crewed with 7 to 10 soldiers and the Wagenburg was equipped with bombards.

The Ottoman center included the Janissaries and levies from Rumelia deployed around two Thracian burial mounds. Murad observed and directed the battle from one of them. The Janissaries dug in behind ditches and two palisades. The right wing consisted of Kapikulus and Sipahis from Rumelia, and the left wing was made up by Akıncıs, Sipahis from Anatolia, and other forces. Janissary archers and Akıncı light cavalry were deployed on the Franga plateau.

Battle

The light Ottoman cavalry assaulted the Croats of ban Franco Talotsi. Christians from the left riposted with bombards and firearms and stopped the attack. Christian soldiers chased the Ottomans in a disorderly pursuit. The Anatolian cavalry ambushed them from the flank. The Christian right wing attempted to flee to the small fortress of Galata on the other side of Varna Bay, but most of them were slain in the marshland around Varna Lake and the River Devnya, where Cesarini also met his end. Only ban Talotsi's troops managed to withdraw behind the Wagenburg.

The other Ottoman flank assaulted the Hungarians and Bulgarians of Michael Szilagyi. Their push was stopped and turned back; then Sipahis attacked again. Hunyadi decided to help and advised Władysław to wait until he returned; then advanced with two cavalry companies. The young king, ignoring Hunyadi's advice, rushed 500 of his Polish knights against the Ottoman center. They attempted to overrun the Janissary infantry and take Murad prisoner, and almost succeeded, but in front of Murad's tent Władysław's horse either fell into a trap or was stabbed, and the king was slain by mercenary Kodja Hazar, who beheaded him while doing so. The remaining coalition cavalry were demoralized and defeated by the Ottomans.

On his return, Hunyadi tried frantically to salvage the king's body, but all he could accomplish was to organize the retreat of the remains of his army; it suffered thousands of casualties in the chaos, and was virtually annihilated. Neither the head nor body of the king were ever found. The minnesinger Michael Beheim wrote a song based on the story of Hans Mergest who spent 16 years in Ottoman captivity after the battle.

Aftermath

The death of Władysław left Hungary in the hands of the four-year-old Ladislaus Posthumous of Bohemia and Hungary. He was succeeded in Poland by Casimir IV Jagiellon after a three-year interregnum.

Murad's casualties at Varna were so heavy, it was not until three days later that he realized he was victorious. Nevertheless, the Ottoman victory in Varna, followed by the Ottoman victory in the Second Battle of Kosovo in 1448, deterred the European states from sending any substantial military assistance to the Byzantines during the Ottoman siege of Constantinople in 1453.

Legacy
In the aftermath, the Ottomans had removed a significant opposition to their expansion into central and eastern Europe; subsequent battles forced a large number of Europeans to become Ottoman subjects.

The fallen Polish King was named Władysław III Warneńczyk in memory of the battle.

The Battle of Varna is commemorated on the Tomb of the Unknown Soldier, Warsaw, with the inscription "WARNA 10 XI 1444".

Footnotes

References

 Ervin Liptai (1984), Magyarország hadtörténete I. Zrínyi Katonai Kiadó, Budapest.  –

External links
 Oszk.hu: Battle map of the Battle of Varna – 
  – 

Battle of Varna
Conflicts in 1444
Battle of Varna
Battle of Varna
Battle of Varna
Battle of Varna
Battles involving Bulgaria
Battles involving the Ottoman Empire
Battles involving Bohemia
Battles involving Poland
Battles involving Hungary
Battles involving the Grand Duchy of Lithuania
Battles of the Ottoman–Hungarian Wars
Battles involving Serbia
Battles involving Wallachia
Battles of the Middle Ages
15th-century crusades
Bulgaria–Poland relations